The Cayuga Correctional Facility is a medium-security state prison for men located in Moravia, Cayuga County, New York, owned and operated by the New York State Department of Corrections and Community Supervision.  The facility has a working capacity of 1082 inmates held at medium security.

References

Prisons in New York (state)
Buildings and structures in Cayuga County, New York